The Tiuna UR-53AR50 is a Venezuelan multipurpose military vehicle, presented by CENARECA and assembled locally by Venezolana de Vehículos para la Defensa. The assembly plant is located at Fort Tiuna, Caracas, Distrito Capital, Venezuela.

The Tiuna design was created by Toyota to compete with the American-made Humvee, which was first shown to the public on July 20, 2004.

Production vehicles are built with the support of companies that bring vehicle parts for its construction and co-ops that work at the Fort Tiuna Assembly Plant (VVD Headquarters). This vehicle is designed and built in Venezuela.

Models
The following are known production models for the Tiuna:

Military
Reconnaissance
Anti-Tank
Command Post
Air Defense
 MANPAD-mounted
 As towing vehicle for AAA guns
Communications
Anti-Riot
Recoilless rifle-mounted (M40)
 Multiple rocket launcher
Others
Transportation (Personal)
Cargo (Dry)
Ambulance
Maintenance
Fuel
Water tanker
Civilian
SUV

Operators

 
 
 
 : Used by Venezuelan military since 2004.

References

External links 
 Official Site - (Archived)

Military vehicles of Venezuela
Military trucks
Military light utility vehicles